D Train was an American duo that had hits on the Billboard magazine Dance and R&B charts during the first half of the 1980s. Three of their singles also reached the top 30 in the UK Singles Chart.

Career
The project was a collaborative effort between the band's namesake, James D-Train Williams, who was featured as the lead vocalist and songwriter, and Hubert Eaves III, a keyboardist, who performed the instrumentation on the recordings. Hailing from Brooklyn, New York City, Williams himself was a R&B-dance producer as well. He and Eaves met during high school and began performing together. Eaves would spend most of the 1970s as a member of the R&B band Mtume. However, by the 1980s, he and Williams had teamed up again. The group named itself D-Train after a nickname Williams had acquired in high school.

D Train released its first single "You're the One for Me" in late 1981. The track became an instant success, hitting number 1 on the US Hot Dance Club Play chart that year; it was remixed and re-released successfully several times since and was contemporaneously covered by Paul Hardcastle with vocalist Kevin Henry in the United Kingdom. The duo's self-titled debut album (which prominently featured the "You're the One for Me" title on the front cover, and the album became known by this name) followed in early 1982, and several additional singles from this effort were successful on both the R&B and Dance charts, although they were not as popular as the debut hit. Among these tracks were "Keep On", which reached number 2 on the Dance chart, and a cover version of the Burt Bacharach and Hal David-penned "Walk On By", which owed more to the Isaac Hayes version than to Dionne Warwick's original recording.

In 1983, the band released its follow-up album, Music. The title track became another dance-floor anthem and nearly equaled the success of the group's debut single. Several other singles from the album were moderately successful.

In 1984, D Train had its only Billboard Hot 100 entry with "Something's on Your Mind," which climbed to number 79 and was later covered by Miles Davis on his album You're Under Arrest. The single also cracked the top five on the R&B chart, becoming the group's biggest hit in that market as well. The accompanying album, also titled Something's on Your Mind, found the band branching out into new musical territory, incorporating elements of reggae and more adult-oriented R&B into their music. Williams himself played acoustic guitar on a cover of Carole King's "So Far Away".

A greatest hits album titled You're the One for Me - The Very Best Of was released in the U.K. in 1985. An equivalent compilation was not released in the U.S. until the following year. Featured on this compilation was a remixed version of "You're the One for Me" that charted in the U.K. that same year. This version was remixed by Paul Hardcastle, who had previously issued a cover version of the song and, by 1985, had become well known for his own hit "19". Despite this success, the group disbanded that same year.

D Train as a solo artist
Following the dissolution of the group, D Train continued on as a successful solo career. Although billed as a solo artist, however, he did continue to work with Eaves acting as a producer and key instrumentalist. In 1986, D Train released his debut album, Miracles of the Heart, which featured a top ten R&B single, "Misunderstanding". The follow-up single, "Oh, How I Love You, Girl" also performed well in the R&B market.

His second album, In Your Eyes followed in 1988. The title track narrowly missed the R&B top ten, and one other single was also released.

Legacy
D Train's albums were eventually re-released on CDs by Unidisc Music, which acquired Prelude Records and several other New York dance-music labels during the 1990s.

The song "You're the One for Me" exists in remixes by Larry Levan and Shep Pettibone, and most recently was sampled by DJ Kue in his 2006 hit "I Got Love". "You're the One for Me" is also sampled in the song "Girls" by the Prodigy from its album Always Outnumbered Never Outgunned.

D Train contributed to the Pokémon anime's "Pokérap" on the official television soundtrack, 2BA Master.

In 1999, D-Train did the backup vocal for "Eyes of a Child", a song written by Trey Parker and Performed by Michael McDonald for the film, South Park Bigger Longer & Uncut.

Williams was hired as a DJ for Heart & Soul Channel 51 on the Sirius Satellite Radio service based in New York City from 2001 to 2008. In 2007, his performances of "My Funny Valentine" and Hot Chocolate's "You Sexy Thing" appeared on the soundtrack of the film Perfect Stranger.

The Notorious B.I.G.'s "Sky's the Limit" interpolates part of D Train's 1982 song "Keep On".

Rapper Yo-Yo's "Iz It Still All Good" sampled D-Train's "Something's on Your Mind," which featured Gerald LeVert, in 1998.

Discography

Studio albums

Compilation albums
 You're the One for Me (The Very Best Of) (1985)
 The Best of "D" Train (1986, 1990)
 The Best of the 12" Mixes (1992)

Singles

See also
List of Billboard number-one dance club songs
List of artists who reached number one on the U.S. Dance Club Songs chart

References

External links
 D Train Discography at Discogs.
 AllMusic Profile.

Electronic music groups from New York (state)
American musical duos
Prelude Records artists
Columbia Records artists
Musical groups established in 1980
Musical groups disestablished in 1985